The Minister for Business, Trade, Tourism and Enterprise is a Junior ministerial post in the Scottish Government. As a result, the Minister does not attend the Scottish Cabinet. The post was retitled in June 2018: the Minister supports the Cabinet Secretary for Finance, Economy and Fair Work and the Cabinet Secretary for Education and Skills, both of whom are members of cabinet.

List of office holders 
The current Minister for Business, Trade, Tourism and Enterprise is Ivan McKee.

History
From 1999 to 2007, enterprise and energy were the responsibility of the Minister for Enterprise and Lifelong Learning. The Second McConnell government from 2003 to 2007 instituted Tourism as a portfolio, combined with Culture and Sport, as the Minister for Tourism, Culture and Sport. The Salmond government, elected following the 2007 Scottish Parliament election created the junior post of Minister for Enterprise, Energy and Tourism by combining the roles.  In November 2014 his post became the Minister for Business, Energy and Tourism, as part of the first Sturgeon government. The post was retitled as Minister for Business, Innovation and Energy as part of the second Sturgeon government, and renamed again in June 2018 to Business, Fair Work and Skills. Upon the creation of the Third Sturgeon Government, the post was once more retitled as Minister for Business, Trade, Tourism and Enterprise.

See also
Scottish Parliament

References

External links 
 Minister for Business, Innovation and Energy on Scottish Government website

Business, Fair Work and Skills
Economy of Scotland
Business in Scotland